Parapellucens is a genus of tussock moths in the family Erebidae.

Species
The following species are included in the genus.
Parapellucens aphrasta Collenette, 1932
Parapellucens tegulatorii Holloway, 1999

References

Natural History Museum Lepidoptera genus database

Lymantriinae
Moth genera